The 2007–08 KNVB Cup was the 90th edition of the premier knockout tournament in the Netherlands. The competition started on 25 August 2007 and the final was held on 27 April 2008 at the Feijenoord Stadion in Rotterdam. Feyenoord defeated Roda JC 2–0 in the final, taking home the cup for the eleventh time.

Teams
 All 18 participants of the Eredivisie 2007-08
 All 20 participants of the Eerste Divisie 2007-08
 Two youth teams
 47 teams from lower (amateur) leagues, the only teams that entered in the first round (one amateur team entered in the second round)

First round
Only amateur clubs from the Hoofdklasse and below participated in this round. Türkiyemspor were expelled from the cup tournament as a result of financial problems, their opponents VVSB advanced to the second round automatically.

Second round
The Eredivisie and Eerste divisie teams; the two youth teams and one extra amateur team entered the tournament this round.

E Eredivisie; 1 Eerste Divisie; A Amateur teams

Third round

Round of 16

Quarter finals

Semi-finals

Final

Feyenoord would play in the UEFA Cup.

See also
 Eredivisie 2007-08
 Eerste Divisie 2007-08

References

External links
 Results by Ronald Zwiers 

2007-08
2007–08 domestic association football cups
2007–08 in Dutch football